Fontenay-sur-Vègre (literally Fontenay on Vègre) is a commune in the Sarthe department in the region of Pays de la Loire in northwestern France.

References

Communes of Sarthe